"Poor Boy (The Greenwood)" is a song written by Jeff Lynne and the Electric Light Orchestra (ELO).

The song is track number 5 from their 1974 album Eldorado and tells the story of the Dreamer on the hill fantasising he is one of Robin Hood's merry men, forming the fourth dream.

"A Robin Hood type character who actually maid Marion."
Jeff Lynne (2001 - Eldorado Remaster)

It was released as the second single A-side from Eldorado in The Netherlands, but failed to chart.

The song was used as the B-side for "Telephone Line" in the US, and in the UK the song was joined with "King of the Universe" on the flip side.

The version performed on their concert film, "Fusion – Live in London" uses the last couple of seconds, 2:27 - 2:57, reprise of "Eldorado Overture", as used for the ending of side 1 of the album.

References

1974 songs
Electric Light Orchestra songs
Song recordings produced by Jeff Lynne
Songs written by Jeff Lynne